Brian "Peña" Perez-Vico (born 20 June 2002) is a Spanish professional footballer who currently plays for Zemplín Michalovce as a attacking midfielder.

Club career

MFK Zemplín Michalovce
Brian Peña made his Fortuna Liga debut for Zemplín Michalovce against Senica on 16 October 2021.

References

External links
 Brian Peňa at MFK Zemplín Michalovce 
 
 Brian Peña Perez-Vico at Futbalnet 
 

2002 births
Living people
People from Vilafranca del Penedès
Sportspeople from the Province of Barcelona
Spanish footballers
Association football midfielders
MFK Zemplín Michalovce players
Slovak Super Liga players
Expatriate footballers in Slovakia
Spanish expatriate sportspeople in Slovakia